Bajram might refer to:

Holiday
Eid

People
Bajram Curri (1862–1925), ethnic Albanian nationalist from Kosovo
Bajram Fetai (born 1985), Danish-Albanian professional football forward
Bajram Franholli (born 1968), former Albanian footballer who played as a left-wing midfielder
Bajram Haliti (born 1955), celebrated Roma scholar and author from Kosovo, active in Romany causes
Bajram Kelmendi (1937–1999), Kosovar lawyer and public figure
Bajram Kosumi (born 1960), ethnic Albanian politician in Kosovo
Bajram Nebihi (born 1988), Kosovan professional footballer of Albanian descent, who plays as a striker
Bajram Rexhepi (born 1954), politician and the first elected post-war Prime Minister of Kosovo
Bajram Sadrijaj (born 1986), professional footballer of Albanian descent

Places
Bajram Curri (town), town in Northern Albania on the border with Kosovo
Bajram Curri Boulevard, major boulevard of Tirana, Albania